Gazmend Çitaku is an Albanian Montenegrin photographer, publisher, and librarian. Born on December 4, 1970 in Skenderaj, Kosovo, he lives and works in Ulcinj, Montenegro. He belongs to the Universum Academy of Switzerland, Bashkimit të Krijuesve Shqiptarë në Mal të Zi (“Union of Albanian Artists in Montenegro”), and the Qendrës Mediterane të Fotografisë dhe Asociacionit Ulqini (Ulcinj Association for Mediterranean Photography”).

Works
Çitaku has published the following collections of his work, including both photography and monographs on the subject:

 Busulla e artë, Botoi Diti&Oli, Ulqin 2022, ISBN 978-9940-661-29-9 https://www.botasot.info/kultura/1786997/gazmend-citaku-vjen-me-librin-e-ri-busulla-e-arte/

 Fotoalbum i Ulqinit. Ulcinj: Bashkimi i Krijuesve shqiptar në Mal të Zi. 2004.
 Servantesi në Ulqin. Documentary film. 2005.
 'Abetare për fëmijët e kopshteve. Ulcinj: Asociacioni Ulqini. 2008.
 Fotoalbum i Ulqinit 2. Ulcinj: Asociacioni Ulqini. 2009.
 Urlaub in Ulqini 1959 - Alfred Wollner. Ulcinj: Asociacioni Ulqini. 2012.
 Tregime të çuditshme nga Ulqini. Ulcinj: Biblioteka Prozë, 2017. .
 Udhëtim në kështjellat ilire në Mal të Zi. Ulcinj: Botoi Diti&Oli, 2019. .

References

Kosovan photographers
People from Skenderaj
1970 births
Living people